Glogovac is a town in Kosovo.

Glogovac may also refer to:

Places
Glogovac, Bogatić, Serbia
Glogovac, Knjaževac, Serbia
Glogovac, Bela Palanka, Serbia
Glogovac, Jagodina, Serbia
Glogovac, Cazin, Bosnia and Herzegovina
Glogovac monastery

People with the surname
Nebojša Glogovac (1969–2018), Serbian actor
Stefan Glogovac (born 1994), Bosnian basketball player
Stevo Glogovac (born 1973), Bosnian Serb football player and manager
Dragan Glogovac (born 1967), Bosnian Serb football player